Gromit is a fictional dog.

Gromit may also refer to:
 Netscape 5, a web browser suite

See also
Grömitz, a municipality in Schleswig-Holstein, Germany
Grommet